"Teacher, Teacher" is a single by 38 Special from the soundtrack to the film Teachers. It reached number 25 on the Billboard Hot 100 in 1984. Don Barnes sang lead vocals on the song.

Charts

References

1984 songs
1984 singles
38 Special (band) songs
Songs written by Jim Vallance
Songs written by Bryan Adams
Capitol Records singles
Songs written for films
Songs about educators